A. L. Ramesh is an Indian film editor, who has worked on Tamil and Telugu films. He has often collaborated on ventures associated with directors Samuthirakani and Sasikumar. Before entering into film industry he worked in the Tamil serial industry. Especial Chitti a serial from Radaan Media Works For his work in Naadodigal (2009), he received a nomination from the Vijay Awards for Best Editor. (2014) won Tamilnadu state award for Best Editor (film Nimirndhunil)

Filmography

As editor
 Nadantha Kathai (Short film) (2009)
 Naadodigal (2009)
 Easan (2010)
 Shambo Shiva Shambo (Telgu 2010)
 Sagakkal (2011)
 Doo (2011)
 Poraali (2011)
 Sabashsariyanapotti (2011)
 Nugam (2013)
 Pattathu Yaanai (2013)
 Breaking news live (Malayalam 2013)
 Ivanuku Thannila Gandam (2014)
 Nimirndhu Nil (2014)
 Vel murugan borewells (2014)
 Murugaatrupadai (2014)
 Iridiyam (2015)
 Vandhamala (2015)
 Kadalai (2016)
 Vetrivel (2016)
 Appa (2016)
 Zoom (Malayalam 2016)
 Enga Amma Rani (2017)
 Thondan (2017)
 Adhagappattathu Magajanangalay (2017)
 Thoongakangal (2020)
 Naadodigal 2 (2020)
 Vinodhaya Sitham (2021)
 Thanne Vandi (2021)
 Vellai Yaanai (2021)

References

External links
 

Living people
Telugu film editors
Tamil film editors
Year of birth missing (living people)
Place of birth missing (living people)